Cycas silvestris is a species of cycad. It is native to Queensland, where it is confined to the Cape York Peninsula.

References

silvestris
Endemic flora of Queensland